Dzhuldzhag is a rural locality (a selo) and the administrative centre of Dzhuldzhagsky Selsoviet, Tabasaransky District, Republic of Dagestan, Russia. The population was 715 as of 2010.

Geography 
Dzhuldzhag is located 9 km west of Khuchni (the district's administrative centre) by road. Yurgulig is the nearest rural locality.

References 

Rural localities in Tabasaransky District